William Penn Adair (1830–1880) was a leader of the Cherokee Nation. Born in the traditional Cherokee territory in Georgia, he traveled as a child with his family on the Trail of Tears of Indian Removal from the Southeast to Indian Territory to what is now Oklahoma.  He became an attorney who served in public office both before and after the American Civil War and as a justice of their nation's court. He entered the Confederate States Army, and he achieved the rank of colonel. Like many others, he joined on the promise that the Confederacy would support a Native American state if it won the War. He served as Cherokee Nation delegate at Washington, D.C. during the 1860s and 1870s.

Background
William Penn Adair was born on April 15, 1830, in the old Cherokee Nation in New Echota, Georgia. His parents were George Washington Adair (1806-1862) and Martha (née Martin) Adair. The family was forced to remove to Indian Territory in 1838, a process which their people called the Trail of Tears, because of the loss of their lands and the high number of deaths along the way. 

Adair attended Cherokee schools in Indian Territory, and studied law. He became a Freemason, belonging to the Vinita Lodge No. 5, which was chartered in 1875. He was described as being "six foot and two inches in height, magnetic, logical and frankly agreeable, the ablest and most brilliant of all Cherokees."

Adair married Sarah Ann McNair. After her death, he married again, to Susannah "Sue" McIntosh Drew. He lived on land along the Grand River in what is now Adair, Oklahoma. It was named for him.

Military service
During the Civil War, Adair served in the Confederate States Army, first in the First Regiment of Cherokee Mounted Volunteers, under General Stand Watie. The Confederacy had promised the nations in Indian territory that it would support an Indian-controlled state if it won the war. Adair rose to the rank of colonel and organized the Second Cherokee Mounted Volunteers.

Tribal leadership
Adair served the Cherokee Nation in many capacities. He was a senator, a justice of the Cherokee Supreme Court, delegate to Washington, DC, and assistant principal chief. He served as the Senator from the Flint District from 1855-1860 and Senator from the Saline District from 1869-1874. In 1879, he was elected as Assistant Chief. Throughout the 1860s and 1870s, Adair served as a delegate from the Cherokee Nation to Washington.

He was a vocal advocate for the rights of the Texas Cherokees. He served as Chairman of the Texas Cherokees and Affiliated (later Associate) Bands from 1871 until his death in 1880. During this period in 1873, he and Clement Neely Vann co-authored the book, History of the Claim of the Texas Cherokees, which they wrote on behalf of "the Texas Cherokees and Affiliated Bands." The Texas Cherokees and Associate Bands was established by Adair and John Adair Bell in the early 1850s in the Mount Tabor Indian Community in Rusk County, Texas for the purposes of seeking redress over the violations of the 1836 Treaty of Bowles Village which later led to the Cherokee-Texas war in 1839 as well as later actions by Texas Cherokee leader Chicken Trotter until the Treaty of Birds Fort in 1843 that ended hostilities.

The Texas Cherokee continued to seek compensation from the state of Texas for lands taken from them in 1839. Adair along with other Confederate Cherokees went to Washington in order to petition Congress to allow him to sue the state to return lands in Texas once belonging to Texas Cherokee people. Initially this was to allow Southern Cherokees to relocate back on treaty lands due to the hostilities of Cherokee factions after the war. Some of these issues went back to the Ross-Ridge party feuds stemming from the Trail of Tears that had been played out during the Civil War. The main point for the suit was that in 1839, while the Republic of Texas was independent, President Mirabeau Lamar had forcibly driven most of the Texas Cherokee into Indian Territory and seized their lands in East Texas. In the 1850s the state had offered lands in the Texas Panhandle in exchange, but Adair refused to accept that offer. No such offer was made to settle after that. However the Texas Cherokees and Associate Bands continued to pursue litigation as late as 1963 some eighty-three years after Adair's death.

Death and legacy
While in Washington, D.C., Adair died on October 23, 1880. He was initially buried in Arlington National Cemetery in Washington, D.C., but his body was soon thereafter transferred to the Tahlequah City Cemetery in Tahlequah, Oklahoma. This move was paid for by the Cherokee Nation.

Several Cherokee boys were named after him in the late 19th century, including the celebrated Cherokee humorist William Penn Adair Rogers (better known as Will Rogers). Adair, Oklahoma was named for William Penn Adair and his brother, Dr. Walter Thompson Adair.
 In 1955, he was inducted into the Hall of Great Westerners of the National Cowboy & Western Heritage Museum.

Notes

References

Sources
Adair, William Penn and C. N. Vann. History of the Claim of the Texas Cherokees. New York: Morgan, Comes, and Lawrence, 1873.
Littlefield, Daniel F., Jr. and James W. Parins. A Biobibliography of Native American Writers, 1772-1924: A Supplement. 1985. .
Rogers, Will, Arthur Frank Wertheim, and Barbara Bair. The Papers of Will Rogers: From Vaudeville to Broadway: September 1908–August 1915. Norman: University of Oklahoma Press, 2001. .
Starr, Emmett. History of the Cherokee Indians and Their Legends and Folklore, Oklahoma City: Warden Company, 1921.

External links
 
Cherrie Adair Moore, "William Penn Adair", Chronicles of Oklahoma, Spring 1951.
Handbook of Texas Online: Mount Tabor Indian Community

                   

1830 births
1880 deaths
Cherokee Confederates
People from Gordon County, Georgia
People of Indian Territory in the American Civil War
Native American writers
American diplomats
Cherokee Nation politicians (1794–1907)
Confederate States Army officers
19th-century Native American politicians
People of Indian Territory
People from Adair, Oklahoma